FilterKeys is an accessibility feature of Microsoft Windows. It tells the keyboard to ignore brief or repeated keystrokes. This makes typing easier for users with hand tremors.

History 
Microsoft first introduced FilterKeys with Windows 95. The feature is also used on later versions of Windows.

Enabling
FilterKeys is turned on by holding the right  key for 8 seconds. This feature can also be turned on and off via the Accessibility settings in the Windows Control Panel or via Windows Settings.

See also 
 StickyKeys
 MouseKeys
 Togglekeys

External links 
 Tutorial on enabling and using FilterKeys

References 

Computer accessibility
User interface techniques
Ergonomics
Windows components